is a Japanese businessman, president and chief executive officer (CEO) of Nippon Telegraph and Telephone (NTT), the third largest telecommunications company in the world in terms of revenue, since June 2018.

Jun Sawada was born on 30 July 1955.

Sawada joined NTT in April 1978, and has held various senior positions at the company. He succeeded Hiroo Unoura as CEO in June 2018.

References

Living people
1955 births
Japanese chief executives